Garges-lès-Gonesse (literally Garges near Gonesse) is a commune in the Val-d'Oise department in northern France. It is located in the northern suburbs of Paris,  from the center of Paris. The city is a part of the Paris urban area. It is the seat of the canton of Garges-lès-Gonesse, which also covers Arnouville.

The city is strongly urbanized and is near to Paris–Le Bourget Airport. Garges-lès-Gonesse was transformed from an old rural village to a suburb at the beginning of the 20th century.

Population

Transport
Garges-lès-Gonesse is served by Garges – Sarcelles station on Paris RER line D.

Education
Primary schools:
13 preschools
11 elementary schools
Four combined preschools and elementary schools

Secondary schools:
Junior high schools: Paul Eluard, Henri Wallon, Pablo Picasso, and Henri Matisse
Senior high school/sixth-form college: Lycée Simone de Beauvoir
Vocational high school: Lycée professionel Arthur Rimbaud

Personalities
Diamory Sylla, basketball player
Marc Macedot,  athlete
Mr. Brainwash, street artist

See also
Communes of the Val-d'Oise department

References

External links
Official website 

Association of Mayors of the Val d'Oise 

Communes of Val-d'Oise